César Augusto Yanis Velasco (born 28 January 1996) is a Panamanian footballer who plays as left winger for Zamora, on loan from Costa del Este, and the Panama football team.

Club career
Born in Panama City, Yanis played for local sides San Francisco, Chorrillo and Costa del Este. On 31 August 2021, he moved abroad and joined Spanish Segunda División side Real Zaragoza on a one-year loan deal.

International career
Yanis made his debut for the Panama national team in a 0-0 friendly tie with Nicaragua on 26 February 2020.

On 17 July 2021, Yanis scored his first goal for Panama against Honduras.

International goals

References

External links
 
 
 

1996 births
Living people
Sportspeople from Panama City
Panamanian footballers
Panama international footballers
Association football midfielders
San Francisco F.C. players
Costa del Este F.C. players
Liga Panameña de Fútbol players
Segunda División players
Real Zaragoza players
2021 CONCACAF Gold Cup players
Panamanian expatriate footballers
Panamanian expatriate sportspeople in Spain
Expatriate footballers in Spain